Monacolins are a group of compounds found in yeast species:

 Monacolin J
 Monacolin K or lovastatin